Trilogia dos Carnavais: 25 Anos de Carreira ou de Lápide (Portuguese for "Trilogy of the Carnivals: 25 Years of Career or of Tombstone") is a live album by the Brazilian musician Rogério Skylab. It was released on August 30, 2016 through independent label , and recorded during a show at the Estúdio 24P in Rio de Janeiro, in which Skylab celebrated 25 years of musical career and promoted his Trilogia dos Carnavais series of albums: Abismo e Carnaval (2012), Melancolia e Carnaval (2014) and Desterro e Carnaval (2015). A DVD containing footage of the performance and additional tracks was simultaneously released. It is Skylab's first of two releases not to be available for free download on his official website, the second being the 2017 EP Skylab. "O que te Perturba" was released as a teaser single on Skylab's YouTube channel on April 24, 2016.

Arrigo Barnabé, Fausto Fawcett and Tavinho Paes were guest musicians on the album; they all previously appeared on Desterro e Carnaval. Paes, however, only appears in the DVD, reciting his poem "Perdas e Ganhos".

Track listing

CD

DVD
All tracks written by Rogério Skylab, except for "Cogito" by Torquato Neto; "A Árvore" by Skylab and Fausto Fawcett; "Perdas e Ganhos" by Tavinho Paes; and "Eu e Minha Ex" by Jupiter Apple.

 "Abismo e Carnaval"
 "Baleia de Aquário"
 "Empadinha de Camarão"
 "Branco do Brasil"
 "Lívia" (feat. Arrigo Barnabé)
 "Hino Americano"
 "Aqui Todo Mundo É Preto"
 "Quando Voltava das Festas"
 "O que te Perturba"
 "Se Fosse Impossível a Canção"
 "Atravesso os Dias"
 "Tarde de Sol no Rio de Janeiro"
 "Cogito"
 "Sem Saída"
 "Um Acorde Imperfeito"
 "Sem Você"
 "Só"
 "Equivocidade"
 "A Árvore" (feat. Fausto Fawcett)
 "Perdas e Ganhos" (feat. Tavinho Paes)
 "Eu e Minha Ex" (Jupiter Apple cover)
 "Vamos Esquecer"

Personnel
 Rogério Skylab – vocals, production
 Thiago Martins – electric guitar
 Alexandre Guichard – classical guitar
 Yves Aworet – bass guitar
 Bruno Coelho – drums
 Arrigo Barnabé – additional vocals in "Lívia"
 Fausto Fawcett – additional vocals in "A Árvore"
 Tavinho Paes – vocals in "Perdas e Ganhos"
 Vânius Marques – mixing, mastering
 Juliana Torres – photography, cover art

References

2016 live albums
2016 video albums
Live video albums
Rogério Skylab albums
Obscenity controversies in music